The 2002–03 Slovenian Third League was the 11th season of the Slovenian Third League, the third highest level in the Slovenian football system.

League standings

Centre

East

North

West

See also
2002–03 Slovenian Second League

References

External links
Football Association of Slovenia 

Slovenian Third League seasons
3
Slovenia